Elsabeth Ann "Ellie" Black  (born September 8, 1995) is a Canadian artistic gymnast. She is a three-time Olympian, having represented her country at the 2012, 2016, and 2020 Olympic Games. She is the 2017 World all-around silver medalist, making her the first Canadian gymnast to win a world all-around medal, and she led the Canadian women's gymnastics team to a bronze medal in the 2022 World Championships team final, the first world team medal won by a Canadian gymnastics team. She won a silver medal on the balance beam at the 2022 World Championships. She is also the 2018 Commonwealth Games all-around champion, a two-time Pan American Games all-around champion (2015, 2019), and a six-time Canadian national all-around champion (2013-2015, 2017-2019). At the 2020 Olympic Games, Black placed fourth in the balance beam final, the highest placement in the Olympics for a female Canadian gymnast.

Black began competing internationally in 2012 and helped the 2012 Canadian Olympic team qualify for their first Olympic team final where they finished fifth. In 2013, she became the first Canadian female artistic gymnast to win a medal at the Universiade since 1983 by winning a silver medal on the floor exercise and a bronze medal on the balance beam, and she competed at her first World Championships, making the all-around and floor exercise finals. She competed at her first Commonwealth Games in 2014 and won the gold medal on the balance beam. She qualified for the all-around and balance beam finals at the 2014 and 2015 World Championships. She won five medals at the 2015 Pan American Games and was the most decorated Canadian athlete at the Games. At the 2016 Olympic Games, Black finished fifth in the individual all-around final, Canada's best-ever result in the Olympic all-around. She won her first World medal in 2017 and won team and all-around gold at the 2018 Commonwealth Games. In 2019, she became the first female gymnast to win back-to-back all-around titles at the Pan American Games and became Canada's most decorated gymnast ever at the Pan American Games. She made her third Olympic appearance in 2020 and won two medals at the 2022 World Championships. Black is the most decorated female Canadian gymnast ever.

Early life 
Black was born on September 8, 1995, in Halifax, Nova Scotia to parents Thomas and Katharine Black. Her older sister, Karen, competed in figure skating. Her younger brother William also competed in gymnastics and was the 2016 Canadian champion on the vault. She began gymnastics when she was nine years old. Originally, she trained in both gymnastics and figure skating, but she decided to focus only on gymnastics.

Junior career 
Black competed at the novice level at the 2008 Canadian Championships where she finished twenty-second in the all-around final. Then in December, she competed at the junior level at Elite Canada and placed sixteenth in the all-around and won the bronze medal on vault.

In December 2009, Black competed at Elite Canada in Oakville, Ontario. She placed tenth in the all-around competition with a score of 49.35 and third on vault with a score of 12.925.

Black competed at the 2010 Canadian Championships in Kamloops, British Columbia. She placed fourteenth in the all-around final with a score of 50.300.  In event finals, she placed third on vault scoring 13.950 and first on the balance beam scoring 14.500. Then in December, Black competed at Elite Canada in Gatineau, Quebec. She placed fourteenth in the all-around with a score of 48.950, second on the vault with a score of 13.600, fourth on the balance beam with a score of 12.950, and eighth on the floor exercise with a score of 12.450.

Senior career 
Black became age-eligible for senior international competition in 2011, but she missed the entire 2011 season after having surgery for a dislocated and broken toe and then dislocating her elbow.

2012
In February, Black competed at Elite Canada in Mississauga, Canada. She placed ninth in the all-around with a total score of 52.350. In event finals, Black placed first on vault scoring 14.750, third on balance beam scoring 13.550, and seventh on floor scoring 12.600. Then in March, she made her international debut at the International Gymnix held in Montreal. She finished second in the all-around in the Challenge Cup behind Canadian teammate Christine Peng-Peng Lee. Then in the event finals, she won the gold medal on vault and the silver medal on balance beam, and she placed tenth on uneven bars and fourth on floor. At the 2nd AG Meeting, a tri-meet between Canada, Brazil, and South Korea, she won gold medals on both the vault and balance beam and started appearing to be a contender for the 2012 Olympic team. She then competed at the Osijek World Challenge Cup and won her first FIG World Cup medals with gold on both the vault and floor exercise.

In May, Black competed at the Canadian Championships in Regina, Canada. Prior to the competition, she spoke to International Gymnast Magazine about her Olympic goals stating "The positive results from recent competitions are a strong motivator to keep working hard and improve further... Hopefully this will prepare me to have a strong performance at Nationals, which is an important competition for the [Olympic] team selection". She placed third all-around in qualifications but dropped to seventh in the all-around final with a score of 53.600.  In event finals, Black placed first on vault scoring 14.475, seventh on balance beam scoring 12.800, and third on floor scoring 13.950.

At the end of June, Black was one of the twelve gymnasts chosen to compete at the Final Olympic Selection meet in Gatineau, Canada.  On the first day of competition she placed sixth in the all-around with a score of 52.050, second on vault, fourth on floor, sixth on beam, and ninth on floor.  Based on her performances here and at the Canadian Championships she was selected to the five-member Olympic team alongside Kristina Vaculik, Victoria Moors, Brittany Rogers, and Dominique Pegg. She was the first female gymnast living east of Montreal to ever make the Canadian Olympic team.

In July, Black competed at the 2012 Summer Olympics in London, United Kingdom. She helped the Canadian team qualify for the team finals for the first time in a non-boycotted Olympics, and individually, she qualified for the vault final. In the team final, the Canadian team finished fifth, the country's best ever result in an Olympic team final. In the vault final, Black injured her left ankle on her first vault after landing on all fours, receiving a score of 0.000. She tried to attempt her second vault, but decided not to because of the injury, meaning she placed eighth with a final score of 0.000. She did not compete for the rest of the year due to the injury.

2013 
Black returned to competition at Elite Canada and won gold medals in the all-around, vault, uneven bars, and balance beam, and she won the silver medal on the floor exercise behind Victoria Moors. She then competed at the Tokyo World Cup and won the all-around bronze medal behind Japanese gymnast Asuka Teramoto and American gymnast Peyton Ernst. She won gold medals in the vault, balance beam, and floor exercise event finals at the Ljubljana World Challenge Cup.

In May, Black won the all-around title at the Canadian Championships and also won balance beam gold, floor exercise silver, and vault bronze. At the Summer Universiade, Black finished fourth in the all-around with a score of 55.000, only two-tenths of a point away from the bronze medal. In the event finals, she finished fourth on vault by 0.088, third on beam, and tied for second on floor. This marked the first time a Canadian gymnast had won a medal at the Universiade since 1983. Then at the World Championships, she finished thirteenth in the all-around and eighth on the floor exercise.

2014 
In February, Black competed at Elite Canada and won the all-around bronze medal behind Victoria Moors and Aleeza Yu. In the event finals, she won the silver medal on the uneven bars and the gold medal on the balance beam. She then won the all-around and floor exercise gold medals at the International Gymnix and the uneven bars and balance beam bronze medals. She then competed at the Pacific Rim Championships with Yu, Maegan Chant, Rose-Kaying Woo, Shallon Olsen, and Megan Roberts, and they won the team silver medal behind the United States. Individually, Black won the all-around bronze medal behind Americans Elizabeth Price and Kyla Ross. In the event finals, she won gold on the vault and placed fifth on uneven bars, sixth on balance beam, and fourth on floor exercise. She defended her Canadian all-around title and also became Canadian champion on the uneven bars.

At the Commonwealth Games, Black finished fourth with her team, and fourth in the all-around. In the event finals, Black won gold on the balance beam, silver on the vault, bronze on the floor exercise, and she finished fourth on the uneven bars. She competed at the World Championships in Nanning, China. The Canadian team finished twelfth and failed to advance to the team final, but Black qualified for the all-around and balance beam finals. In the all-around final, she placed ninth, the highest ever placement in a World or Olympic all-around final by a Canadian, besting compatriot Victoria Moors' tenth-place finish from the year before. In the balance beam final, she placed seventh after a fall. After the World Championships, she competed at the Stuttgart World Cup and finished seventh in the all-around. She then won the silver medal in the all-around at the Glasgow World Cup behind Romanian Larisa Iordache.

2015 
In January, Black competed at the Elite Canada competition, winning the balance beam title, which was the only event she competed in. She then competed at the American Cup in Arlington, Texas and placed fifth with an all-around score of 56.132. Then at the City of Jesolo Trophy and helped the Canadian team win the bronze medal behind the United States and Italy. Individually, Black won the bronze medal on the vault.

In May, Black won her third consecutive Canadian all-around title with a score of 57.950. In July, Black competed at the Pan American Games which was hosted in Toronto. The Canadian team of Black, Maegan Chant, Madison Copiak, Isabela Onyshko, and Victoria-Kayen Woo won a silver medal behind the United States. In the all-around final, Black won the gold medal with a score of 58.150, becoming the first non-American woman to become Pan American all-around champion since 1983 and the first Canadian to win the title since 1979. She then won the bronze medal in the vault final with an average score of 14.087. In the balance beam final, she won gold with a score of 15.050, one point ahead of the silver medalist, Megan Skaggs, and she also won the gold medal in the floor exercise final. She was the most decorated Canadian athlete of the 2015 Pan American Games.

In September, Black was selected to compete at the World Championships alongside Isabela Onyshko, Brittany Rogers, Audrey Rousseau, Sydney Townsend, and Victoria-Kayen Woo. The Canadian team had a strong performance in the qualifying round and qualified for the team final in seventh place, ensuring a full team berth at the 2016 Olympic Games. Black also qualified to the all-around final in fourth place with a score of 57.299 and in third place to the balance beam final with a 14.600. In the team finals, she contributed scores of 14.233 on the floor, 15.100 on the vault, and 13.566 on the beam to help the Canadian team finish sixth, their best-ever team finish at a World Championships. In the all-around final, she set a new record for the highest placement by a Canadian by finishing in seventh place. In the beam final, she fell on her full twist and finished in seventh place for the second year in a row.

2016 
At Elite Canada, Black won the all-around bronze medal behind Isabela Onyshko and Megan Roberts. She then competed at the American Cup in Newark, New Jersey and won the all-around bronze medal behind Americans Gabby Douglas and Maggie Nichols. Then at the Canadian Championships, she won the all-around silver medal behind Onyshko. She then won the gold medal in the all-around at the Olympic Trials.

Black was chosen to represent Canada at the Olympic Games in Rio de Janeiro alongside Isabela Onyshko, Shallon Olsen, Brittany Rogers, and Rose-Kaying Woo. The team failed to qualify for the team final, finishing in ninth place just 0.168 points behind the Dutch team. In the all-around final, Black finished in fifth place with a score of 58.298, the highest place finish for a Canadian gymnast in the all-around at the Olympic Games.

2017 
Black's first competition after the Olympic Games was the Koper World Challenge Cup, where she won silver medals on uneven bars, balance beam, and floor exercise. In May, she won her fourth national all-around title. She also won the national title on floor exercise, was the runner-up on vault behind Shallon Olsen and on the beam behind Isabela Onyshko, and placed sixth on uneven bars. At the Summer Universiade, she led the Canadian team to the silver medal behind Russia. Individually, she won bronze in the all-around final behind Romanian Larisa Iordache and Japanese Asuka Teramoto. In the event finals, she won gold on the beam and bronze on the bars and placed fourth on both the vault and floor.

At the World Championships in Montreal, Black qualified for the all-around final in third place, the vault final in seventh, and the balance beam final in fourth. She was originally a reserve for the floor exercise final but was put in as a replacement for the injured American Ragan Smith. Black made history in the all-around final by becoming the first Canadian to win an all-around medal at a World Championships, winning the silver medal behind American Morgan Hurd. During event finals, she placed fourth on vault, eighth on balance beam after a fall, and seventh on floor exercise after an out-of-bounds deduction. After the World Championships, she competed at the Toyota International and tied for the bronze medal on the vault with Mai Murakami.

2018
Black only competed on the uneven bars at Elite Canada and finished seventh. In February, she was named to the team to compete at the Commonwealth Games alongside Shallon Olsen, Isabela Onyshko, Brittany Rogers, and Rose-Kaying Woo. She helped Canada win gold for the first time since the 1990 Commonwealth Games ahead of second place England in the team finals. Individually, Black won gold in the all-around ahead of Georgia Godwin of Australia and Alice Kinsella of England. She also won silver on vault, behind Olsen, and placed sixth on balance beam and fourth on floor exercise.

In May, Black competed at the Canadian Championships where she won gold in the all-around. Then in September, she competed at the Paris Challenge Cup where she won silver on vault behind Oksana Chusovitina of Uzbekistan, bronze on uneven bars behind Juliette Bossu of France and Jonna Adlerteg of Sweden, gold on balance beam, and silver on floor exercise behind Mélanie de Jesus dos Santos of France. She was then named to the team to compete at the World Championships alongside Brooklyn Moors, Ana Padurariu, Shallon Olsen, and Sophie Marois. She helped Canada place fourth in the team final behind the United States, Russia, and China. Individually, Black placed twelfth in the all-around, seventh on vault, and fifth on the balance beam.

2019 
Black began the 2019 season competing at Elite Canada where she placed second in the all-around behind Ana Padurariu. She also won gold on vault, silver on uneven bars and balance beam, once again behind Padurariu, and bronze on floor exercise behind Padurariu and Victoria-Kayen Woo.  In March, Black competed at the American Cup where she tied for the bronze medal in the all-around with Mai Murakami, behind Americans Leanne Wong and Grace McCallum. The following month, she competed at the Tokyo World Cup where she won silver in the all-around behind American Morgan Hurd. In May, she competed at the Canadian Championships and claimed her sixth national all-around title. Additionally, she won gold on floor exercise, silver on uneven bars behind Padurariu, and bronze on the balance beam behind Brooklyn Moors and Padurariu.

In June, Black was named to the team to compete at the Pan American Games alongside Moors, Isabela Onyshko Shallon Olsen, and Victoria-Kayen Woo. The team won the silver medal in the team final behind the United States. In the all-around final, Black was able to defend her Pan American Games all-around title by winning the gold ahead of Riley McCusker of the United States and Flávia Saraiva of Brazil. During the first day of event finals, she won gold on vault ahead of Yesenia Ferrera of Cuba and teammate Olsen and won bronze on uneven bars behind Americans McCusker and Leanne Wong The following day, she won the silver medal on balance beam behind American Kara Eaker and finished fourth on the floor behind Moors, Eaker, and Saraiva. With a total of nine Pan American Games medals including five gold medals, she became the most decorated Canadian gymnast in Pan American Games history. She was selected as Canada's flag-bearer for the closing ceremony.

On September 4, Black was named to the team to compete at the World Championships in Stuttgart, Germany alongside Ana Padurariu, Shallon Olsen, Brooklyn Moors, and Victoria Woo. During qualifications, the team placed fifth, thereby qualifying Canada a team to the 2020 Olympic Games in Tokyo. Individually, she qualified for the all-around and balance beam finals. Black competed on all four apparatuses during the team final, helping Canada place seventh. During the individual all-around final, she finished in fourth place behind Simone Biles of the United States, Tang Xijing of China, and Angelina Melnikova of Russia with a score of 56.232, only 0.167 points behind third place. While competing in the all-around final, she injured her ankle and had to withdraw from the balance beam final.

2020 
In February, Black made her season debut at Elite Canada where she only competed on uneven bars and balance beam, which she placed first and fourth on respectively. Then at the American Cup, she placed fifth in the all-around. She was scheduled to compete at the Tokyo World Cup taking place on April 4. However, the Tokyo World Cup was later canceled due to the coronavirus outbreak in Japan.

2021 
Black competed at Elite Canada which was held virtually due to the COVID-19 pandemic in Canada. She finished first in the all-around and on the balance beam. She next competed at two virtual Technical Trials where she finished first in the all-around at both. She then competed at the Canadian Championships where she won her seventh national all-around title. Additionally, she finished first on the balance beam and second on the vault, uneven bars, and floor exercise. On June 17, she was officially named to Canada's 2020 Olympic team alongside Ava Stewart, Shallon Olsen, and Brooklyn Moors.

During the Olympic qualification round, the Canadian team finished tenth, missing out on the team final. Individually, Black qualified for the all-around final in twenty-fourth place and for the balance beam final in sixth place, and she was the third reserve for the vault final. During a training session before the all-around final, she injured her left ankle on a balance beam dismount, causing her to withdraw from the all-around final. She still competed in the balance beam final despite the injury, and she finished in fourth place, only 0.134 points behind bronze medalist Simone Biles. After the Olympic Games, Black traveled across the United States on the Gold Over America Tour.

2022 
Black won the all-around title at the virtual Elite Canada competition. She then competed at the City of Jesolo Trophy where she helped Canada finish third behind the United States and Italy. Individually, she won bronze on vault behind Coline Devillard and Asia D'Amato. In September, she competed at the Paris World Challenge Cup and won bronze on the balance beam behind Marine Boyer and Jade Carey and finished fourth on uneven bars.

Black was selected to compete at the World Championships in Liverpool alongside Laurie Denommée, Emma Spence, Sydney Turner, and Denelle Pedrick. She helped Canada qualify for the team final in eighth place and individually qualified for the all-around, vault, and balance beam finals. During the team final, Black competed on all four apparatuses and helped Canada win the bronze medal, their first team medal at the World Artistic Gymnastics Championships. This bronze medal also earned Canada a team quota for the 2024 Olympic Games. She then finished fifth in the all-around final with a total score of 54.732. In the vault event final, she finished fourth. Then in the balance beam final, she won the silver medal with a score of 13.566 behind Japan's Watanabe Hazuki.

Awards 
In 2018, Black was named one of the 15 greatest athletes in Nova Scotian history. In October 2018, the Lieutenant-Governor of Nova Scotia, Arthur LeBlanc, announced that Black would be awarded the Order of Nova Scotia at a ceremony to be held on November 6, for her contribution as an ambassador for both gymnastics and the province. Black is only the second person under 25 to receive the Order of Nova Scotia, the first being hockey star Sidney Crosby.

Personal life 
Black enjoys cooking and has shared her recipes online.

Eponymous skill 
At the 2022 Paris World Challenge Cup, Black successfully completed a piked clear-hip Tkatchev with ½ turn on the uneven bars. Because she was the first gymnast to complete this skill, it is named after her in the Code of Points.

Competitive history

See also 
 List of Olympic female artistic gymnasts for Canada
 List of female artistic gymnasts with the most appearances at Olympic Games

References

External links 
 
 
 
 

1995 births
Canadian female artistic gymnasts
Commonwealth Games bronze medallists for Canada
Commonwealth Games gold medallists for Canada
Commonwealth Games silver medallists for Canada
Gymnasts at the 2014 Commonwealth Games
Gymnasts at the 2012 Summer Olympics
Living people
Medalists at the World Artistic Gymnastics Championships
Olympic gymnasts of Canada
Sportspeople from Halifax, Nova Scotia
Gymnasts at the 2015 Pan American Games
Gymnasts at the 2019 Pan American Games
Pan American Games bronze medalists for Canada
Pan American Games gold medalists for Canada
Pan American Games silver medalists for Canada
Gymnasts at the 2016 Summer Olympics
Commonwealth Games medallists in gymnastics
Pan American Games medalists in gymnastics
Universiade medalists in gymnastics
Gymnasts at the 2018 Commonwealth Games
Universiade gold medalists for Canada
Universiade silver medalists for Canada
Universiade bronze medalists for Canada
Medalists at the 2013 Summer Universiade
Medalists at the 2017 Summer Universiade
Medalists at the 2015 Pan American Games
Medalists at the 2019 Pan American Games
Gymnasts at the 2020 Summer Olympics
20th-century Canadian women
21st-century Canadian women
Medallists at the 2014 Commonwealth Games
Medallists at the 2018 Commonwealth Games